Leland Stanford "Larry" MacPhail Sr. (February 3, 1890 – October 1, 1975) was an American lawyer and an executive in Major League Baseball. He served as a high-ranking executive, including club president and general manager, with the Cincinnati Reds, Brooklyn Dodgers and New York Yankees, and was a one-third owner of the Yankees from 1945 through 1947. MacPhail's sons and grandsons were also sports executives. He was inducted into the National Baseball Hall of Fame in 1978.

Early life
MacPhail was born in Cass City, Michigan, on February 3, 1890. His father founded State Savings Bank of Scottville, Michigan, in 1882 as well as twenty other small banks in that state. He obtained an LL.B. from the George Washington University Law School, where he became friends with Branch Rickey. He worked for a time with a Chicago law firm. Prior to World War I Larry MacPhail was an executive of a department store in Nashville, Tennessee.

During World War I, he served as an artillery captain in France and Belgium. He accompanied his commander, Colonel Luke Lea, on an unsanctioned mission to Amerongen in the Netherlands in January 1919 to attempt to arrest the exiled German monarch, Kaiser Wilhelm II, and bring him to the Paris Peace Conference to be tried for war crimes. MacPhail reportedly stole an ashtray that belonged to the Kaiser and received an official reprimand for the mission.

Entry into baseball
After his discharge from military service, MacPhail opened a law office in Columbus, Ohio, where he eventually purchased an interest in the Columbus Red Birds, a minor league affiliate of the St. Louis Cardinals. While in the role of president of the Red Birds, MacPhail came up with a plan to create a geographically based playoff system for determining the league champion of the American Association. It was not well-received and lasted only two years. In 1933 he was hired by the Cincinnati Reds and became its chief executive and general manager. MacPhail had been recommended for the Reds position by Branch Rickey, who said that MacPhail was "a wild man at times, but he'll do the job." After leaving the Reds, he spent about a year with his father's investment business before becoming executive vice-president and general manager of the Brooklyn Dodgers in 1938. He was promoted to team president, a position that had been vacant for about a year after the death of the previous team president Stephen McKeever, on May 4, 1939. In 1939, he received the Sporting News Executive of the Year Award.

MacPhail was pivotal in the development of pioneering sportscaster Red Barber, who announced Reds and Dodgers games for MacPhail. MacPhail's innovations include nighttime baseball, regular game televising, and flying teams between cities. MacPhail resigned as president of the Dodgers on September 23, 1942, to accept a commission in the United States Army. By the end of World War II, MacPhail held the rank of colonel. Returning from the war, MacPhail served as president, co-owner and general manager for the New York Yankees.

MacPhail was well known for his unpredictable behavior which was fueled by bouts of heavy drinking. MacPhail's grandson Andy said, "My grandfather was bombastic, flamboyant, a genius when sober, brilliant when he had one drink and a raving lunatic when he had too many." In one incident, MacPhail was drinking with Boston Red Sox owner Tom Yawkey when the men decided to swap stars Joe DiMaggio and Ted Williams in what would have been the biggest swap of baseball stars in many years. The men decided not to execute the trade after they sobered up.

Leo Durocher, the Dodgers manager who had a tempestuous relationship with MacPhail, recalled, "There is a thin line between genius and insanity, and in Larry's case, it was so thin you could see him drifting back and forth." As the Dodgers returned by train to Grand Central Terminal after winning the 1941 league pennant, Durocher did not want his players to get off early at the 125th Street stop, so he ordered the conductor to pass the stop. MacPhail was planning to board the same train at that stop. He told Durocher that night that he was fired, but he changed his mind the next morning.

MacPhail's career as a major-league owner ended after the Yankees clinched the 1947 World Series, when he got into confrontations at the team's post-game celebrations at Yankee Stadium and then in Manhattan. Though he had already quit as chief executive in the Yankee locker room, books by Roger Kahn and others indicate MacPhail's behavior at the victory parties led to co-owners Dan Topping and Del Webb buying out his share of the ballclub.

Later life and legacy
MacPhail owned a  farm near Bel Air, Maryland, called Glenangus. An owner/breeder of Thoroughbred racehorses, his colt General Staff won the 1952 Narragansett Special at Narragansett Park and five other stake races that year. In March 1952, MacPhail was appointed President of Bowie Race Track in Bowie, Maryland. He held the position for thirteen months, until he was removed from the position and barred entirely from the track; he was accused of "using profanity to three horse owners" and "charged with being drunk and disorderly."

MacPhail died in a Miami nursing home on October 1, 1975, two days after well-known manager Casey Stengel. MacPhail was elected to the Baseball Hall of Fame in 1978.

Several of MacPhail's family members have become sports executives. His son and namesake Lee MacPhail enjoyed a long career in baseball, most notably as president and general manager of the Baltimore Orioles, general manager of the Yankees, and president of the American League. He was elected to the Baseball Hall of Fame in 1998, making him and Larry MacPhail the only father and son inductees. His other son Bill MacPhail was president of CBS Sports and later was President of CNN Sports, brought on by Reese Schonfeld to create the department upon the network's launch. Larry's grandson Andy MacPhail, the former general manager of the Minnesota Twins and  Chicago Cubs and the former president of baseball operations for the Orioles, was president of the Philadelphia Phillies from  through . A great-grandson, Lee MacPhail IV, is a professional scout for the New York Mets. Another, Drew MacPhail, is a member of the Los Angeles Dodgers' front office.

Since 1966, Minor League Baseball has annually awarded the Larry MacPhail Award to recognize the top promotional effort by a minor league team.

In 2013, the Bob Feller Act of Valor Award honored MacPhail as one of 37 Baseball Hall of Fame members for his service in the United States Army during World War II.

See also
The Victory Season: The End of World War II and the Birth of Baseball's Golden Age, 2013 book

References

External links
 
 

1890 births
1975 deaths
20th-century American lawyers
American racehorse owners and breeders
Beloit College alumni
Brooklyn Dodgers executives
Cincinnati Reds executives
George Washington University Law School alumni
Major League Baseball general managers
Major League Baseball team presidents
New York Yankees executives
New York Yankees owners
National Baseball Hall of Fame inductees
People from Bel Air, Maryland
People from Cass City, Michigan
United States Army colonels
United States Army personnel of World War I
United States Army personnel of World War II